Sedjil is an Iranian semi-active radar homing air-to-air missile. It is made by the Self-Sufficiency Jihad Organization of the Islamic Republic of Iran Air Force and is actually a modified version of the surface-to-air MIM-23 HAWK. The Sedjil weighs approximately 500 kg, its length is 5 meters and its diameter is about 40 cm. The effective range of the missile is approximately 90 km. Its speed is estimated to be about 4-5 mach.

After six years of combat in the Iran-Iraq War, the prolonged conflict led to a shortage of weapons for Iranian forces, and they felt the need to procure additional weapons systems. The Islamic Republic of Iran Air Force, employed an experienced test pilot, Fereidoun Ali-Mazandarani, as the experimenter pilot in November 1986, and succeeded to synchronize the mentioned missile with the AN/APG-79 radar of the F-14 Tomcat launch aircraft. Additionally experts in the Islamic Republic of Iran Air Force presented a related plan to convert the HAWK missiles. This plan was presented for the first time on 12 August 1986 with the name of "Project-Sedjil" by Ata'allah-Bazargan (a high-ranking military pilot) and Fereidun Ali Mazandarani. It was submitted to the Iranian air force. The missile was finally manufactured on 4 April 1988.

See also 
 List of military equipment manufactured in Iran
 Islamic Republic of Iran Air Force
 Armed Forces of the Islamic Republic of Iran
 Sejjil
 Iran-Iraq War

References 

Air-to-air missiles of Iran